"Two Weeks" is a song by English singer FKA Twigs from her debut studio album, LP1 (2014). The song was released digitally on 24 June 2014 as the album's lead single. It was also released on 12-inch vinyl on 29 July 2014, featuring the song "Pendulum" as a B-side.

Critical reception
"Two Weeks" was met with acclaim from music critics. The song was chosen upon release as Pitchforks "Best New Track". Patric Fallon described it as "a beguilingly straight-laced cut of silken R&B" and "a commanding blast of raw sexual power." He also stated, "FKA twigs is larger than life here, knocking on the doors of great contemporary pop singers—Ciara, Mariah, and even Aaliyah, to name a few—with her breathy falsetto and magnetic presence." Pitchfork later placed it at number three on its 100 Best Tracks of 2014 list and at number 64 on its 200 Best Tracks of the Decade So Far list. In January 2015, "Two Weeks" was ranked at number two on The Village Voices annual year-end Pazz & Jop critics' poll, after Future Islands' "Seasons (Waiting on You)".

"Two Weeks" was also included in the book "1001 Songs You Must Hear Before You Die".

Music video

The music video was directed by Nabil Elderkin and premiered on 24 June 2014. In the video, FKA Twigs portrays a giant goddess surrounded by miniature dancers, also played by Twigs. The entire video consists of one long dolly-out shot. The video was nominated for Best Visual Effects and Best Cinematography at the 2015 MTV Video Music Awards. It remains her most viewed video on YouTube, standing at 34 million views as of January 2023.

In popular culture 
The song has been featured in the USA Network series Mr. Robot, the CW series The Originals and the Starz series Hightown. It serves as the opening theme of the second season of the Brazilian telenovela Hidden Truths.

It was also featured in a Burberry men's fragrance commercial with Adam Driver.

Track listings
Digital download
"Two Weeks" – 4:08

Limited edition 12-inch single
A. "Two Weeks" – 4:08
B. "Pendulum" – 4:59

Credits and personnel
Credits adapted from the liner notes of LP1.

 FKA Twigs – vocals, additional production, Tempest
 Arca – additional programming, synth
 John Davis – mastering
 Emile Haynie – drums, instruments, production, recording
 Joseph Hartwell Jones – vocal recording
 David Wrench – mixing

Charts

Release history

References

2014 singles
2014 songs
FKA Twigs songs
Music videos directed by Nabil Elderkin
Song recordings produced by Emile Haynie
Songs written by Emile Haynie